Something Blue is an album by blues musician Lightnin' Hopkins recorded in Los Angeles in 1965 and released on the Verve Folkways label in 1967.

Reception

AllMusic's Steve Legget reviewed a CD compilation of the tracks and stated: "the result is actually a pretty decent record, featuring the slickest-sounding (relatively – we're talking Lightnin' here) Hopkins you're ever going to encounter. Given a backing band of Earl Palmer on drums, Jimmy Bond on bass, and Joe "Streamline" Ewing on trombone, Hopkins turns in measured (for him) and almost jazzy renditions of "Shining Moon," "Talk of the Town," and "Shaggy Dad," and even with the unlikely trombone accompaniment, it all works". The Penguin Guide to Blues Recordings called it: "a rather weird album Lightnin' recorded for Verve-Folkways, accompanied by bass, drums and jazz trombonist John "Streamline" Being. Among some routine but perfectly acceptable blues and boogies Lightnin' remembers an old song his brother Joel also sang "Good Times" and the rag song "Shaggy Dad"".

Track listing
All compositions by Sam "Lightnin'" Hopkins except where noted
 "Shaggy Dad" – 2:42
 "I'll Be Gone" – 5:00
 "Shining Moon" – 4:00
 "Shake It Baby" – 4:53
 "Goin' Back Home" – 4:53
 "Good Times" – 4:10
 "What'd I Say" (Ray Charles) – 2:22
 "Don't Wake Me" – 4:42
 "Talk of the Town" – 2:35

Personnel

Performance
Lightnin' Hopkins – electric guitar, vocals
John Ewing – trombone
Jimmy Bond – bass
Earl Palmer – drums

References

Lightnin' Hopkins albums
1967 albums
Verve Forecast Records albums